RJTV 24 Iloilo is a UHF, free to air television channel in the Philippines, owned and operated by Rajah Broadcasting Network, Inc. owner by Ramon "RJ" Jacinto. RJTV 29 broadcast from BOC Bldg., Mapa Street, Iloilo City.

References

Television stations in Iloilo City
2nd Avenue (TV channel) stations
Television channels and stations established in 1996